Joking Apart is a 1978 play by English playwright Alan Ayckbourn.

Overview
Written in response to comments that Ayckbourn only ever wrote about unhappy couples, the play follows Richard and Anthea, a perfect and happily married couple who inadvertently worsen the lives of the couples they have befriended over the course of 12 years: Hugh and Louise, Sven and Olive, and Brian and his seemingly never-ending stream of unsteady girlfriends (Melody, Mandy, Mo, and Debbie). In most productions, Brian's girlfriends are portrayed by the same actress, with characters commenting on their similar physical appearances.

External links
 Joking Apart on official Ayckbourn site

Plays by Alan Ayckbourn
1978 plays